The ed-Dikke Synagogue, located 3 km north of the Sea of Galilee on the eastern bank of the Jordan River in what are the Golan Heights (Jaulan), was an ancient synagogue dating from around the 5th century CE.

History
The synagogue, located at a site known as Khirbet ed-Dikke, was first identified by Gottlieb Schumacher in the 1880s.
In 1905, Heinrich Kohl and Carl Watzinger briefly investigated the site.

It was divided into three aisles by two rows of four columns each.

References

Jews and Judaism in the Roman Empire
ed-Dikke
ed-Dikke
5th-century establishments in the Byzantine Empire